Milena Gaiga (born August 30, 1964 in Port Alberni, British Columbia) is a former hockey player from Canada, who represented her native country at the 1992 Summer Olympics in Barcelona, Spain. There she ended up in seventh place with the Canadian National Women's Team.

References
 Canadian Olympic Committee

External links
 

1964 births
Living people
Canadian female field hockey players
Olympic field hockey players of Canada
Field hockey people from British Columbia
Field hockey players at the 1992 Summer Olympics
People from Port Alberni
20th-century Canadian women
21st-century Canadian women